Michel Mongeau (February 9, 1965 – May 22, 2010) was a Canadian professional ice hockey player. Mongeau was born in Nuns' Island, Quebec.

Biography
As a youth, Mongeau played in the 1977 and 1978 Quebec International Pee-Wee Hockey Tournaments with a minor ice hockey team from Verdun, Quebec.

He played 54 games in the National Hockey League: 50 with the St. Louis Blues and four with the Tampa Bay Lightning. He died May 22, 2010 from cancer.

Career statistics

Regular season and playoffs

References

External links

1965 births
2010 deaths
Asiago Hockey 1935 players
EHC Biel players
Canadian ice hockey centres
Cornwall Aces players
Detroit Vipers players
Diables Noirs de Tours players
Flint Spirits players
Halifax Citadels players
Laval Titan players
Laval Voisins players
Manitoba Moose (IHL) players
Milwaukee Admirals (IHL) players
Ice hockey people from Montreal
Peoria Rivermen (IHL) players
Phoenix Roadrunners (IHL) players
Quebec Rafales players
Saginaw Generals players
St. Louis Blues players
Tampa Bay Lightning players
Undrafted National Hockey League players